Samuel Yellin  (1884–1940), was an American master blacksmith, and metal designer.

Career
Samuel Yellin was born to a Jewish family in Mohyliv-Podilskyi, Ukraine in the Russian Empire in 1884. At the age of eleven, he was apprenticed to a master ironsmith. In 1900, at the age of sixteen, he completed his apprenticeship. Shortly afterwards he left the Ukraine and traveled through Europe. In about 1905, he arrived in Philadelphia, in the United States, where his mother and two sisters were already living. His brother arrived in Philadelphia at about the same time. In early 1906, Yellin took classes at the Pennsylvania Museum School of Industrial Art and within several months was teaching classes there, a position he maintained until 1919.

In 1909, Yellin opened his own metalsmith shop. In 1915, the firm of Mellor, Meigs & Howe, for whom he designed and created many commissions, designed a new studio for Samuel Yellin Metalworkers at 5520 Arch Street in Philadelphia. Yellin died in 1940, but the firm remained there for decades under the direction of Yellin's son, Harvey. Following Harvey's death, the business moved forward under the ownership and guidance of Samuel Yellin's granddaughter, Clare Yellin. The firm has now been in operation for over 110 years as of this writing (2022).

During the building boom of the 1920s, Samuel Yellin Metalworkers employed as many as 250 workers, many of them European artisans. Although Yellin was highly knowledgeable about traditional craftsmanship and design, he also championed creativity and the development of new designs. Samuel Yellin's works can be found in some of the finest buildings in America.

Honors
Yellin received awards from the Art Institute of Chicago (1919), the American Institute of Architects (1920), the Architectural League of New York (1922), and the Bok Civic Award from the City of Philadelphia (1925). He was a member of the Philadelphia Chapter of the American Institute of Architects and the T Square Club, the Philadelphia Sketch Club, and the Architectural League of New York.

Selected works

Universities, colleges and schools

Annapolis Colored High School, Annapolis, Maryland
Bowdoin College
Bryn Mawr College
California Institute of Technology, Pasadena, California
Dominican Academy, New York, New York
Drexel Institute, Philadelphia, Pennsylvania
Eastman School of Music, Rochester, New York
Harvard University, Cambridge, Massachusetts
Haverford College
Jewish Theological Seminary, New York, New York
Oberlin College, Oberlin, Ohio
Allen Memorial Art Museum
Cox Administration Building
Princeton University, Princeton, New Jersey
Swarthmore College
University of Chicago, Chicago, Illinois
University of Michigan, Ann Arbor, Michigan
University of Pennsylvania, Philadelphia, Pennsylvania
University of Pittsburgh, Pittsburgh, Pennsylvania
Cathedral of Learning
Heinz Chapel
Stephen Foster Memorial
University of Texas at Austin, Austin, Texas
University of Tulsa, Tulsa, Oklahoma
University of Virginia, Charlottesville, Virginia
Vanderbilt University, Nashville, Tennessee
Yale University, New Haven, Connecticut
Harkness Tower (gates) 
Swartwout Building, Yale University Art Gallery

Institutional and commercial
(Alphabetical by state)

San Diego Air Station, San Diego, California
Aetna Life Insurance Co, Hartford, Connecticut
Peabody Museum, New Haven, Connecticut
Bok Singing Tower, Lake Wales, Florida
Sarasota Court House, Sarasota, Florida
Union Pacific RR Station, Boise, Idaho
Art Institute of Chicago, Chicago, Illinois
Union Station, Indianapolis, Indiana
Baltimore Trust Company, Baltimore, Maryland
Detroit Institute of Art, Detroit, Michigan
Detroit Public Library, Detroit, Michigan
Detroit Society of Arts and Crafts, Detroit, Michigan
Grand Rapids Art Gallery, Grand Rapids, Michigan
University of Michigan Law Library, Ann Arbor, Michigan
Lauren Rogers Museum of Art, Laurel, Mississippi
Morristown Memorial, Morristown, New Jersey
Ritz-Carlton Hotel, Atlantic City, New Jersey
Victor Talking Machine Co, Camden, New Jersey
American Radiator Building, New York, New York
Barclay-Vesey Building, New York, New York
Central Savings Bank, New York, New York
The Cloisters (Metropolitan Museum of Art), New York, New York
Dime Savings Bank, Brooklyn, New York
Federal Reserve Bank of New York, New York, New York
Ford Motor Company, New York
General Motors Co., New York
International Business Machine (IBM) New York
Salvation Arm Headquarters, New York, New York
Allegheny County Courthouse, Pittsburgh, Pennsylvania
Fidelity Mutual Life Insurance Company Building, Philadelphia, Pennsylvania
Candoro Marble Works (showroom door), Knoxville, Tennessee
Fidelity Bankers Trust, Knoxville, Tennessee
Seattle Art Museum, Seattle, Washington
Citizens Bank, Weston, West Virginia

Ecclesiastical

Baltimore Pro-Cathedral, Baltimore, Maryland
Blessed Sacrament Cathedral, Detroit, Michigan	
Church of the Good Shepherd (Rosemont, Pennsylvania)
Congregation Emanu-El of the City of New York, NY
Grace Cathedral, San Francisco, California
Holy Trinity Lutheran Church, Akron, Ohio
Park Avenue Christian Church, New York
Salt Lake City Cathedral, Salt Lake City, Utah
St. Bartholomew's Church, New York
St John's Cathedral, Denver, Colorado
Cathedral of St. John the Divine, New York
St. Joseph's Roman Catholic Church, Canaan, Connecticut
Episcopal Church of the Evangelist, Philadelphia, Pennsylvania. Now Fleisher Art Memorial.
St. Mark's Episcopal Church (Philadelphia, Pennsylvania), Pennsylvania
St. Patrick's Cathedral, New York
St. Patrick's Church, Philadelphia, Pennsylvania
St. Paul's Episcopal Church, Kansas City, Missouri
St. Thomas Church, New York
St. Vincent Ferrer, New York
Washington National Cathedral, Washington D.C.
Washington Memorial Chapel, Valley Forge Pennsylvania

Residential

(Alphabetical by state)

Winterthur, Henry DuPont residence, Wilmington, Delaware
Dumbarton Oaks, Robert Woods Bliss residence, Washington, D.C.
Cyrus McCormick residence, Chicago, Illinois
Cranbrook, George Gough Booth residence, Bloomfield Hills, Michigan
George Eastman residence, Rochester, New York
Fred Fisher residence, Detroit, Michigan
 William E. Scripps Estate, Lake Orion, Michigan
George H. Christian Mansion, Minneapolis, Minnesota (current home of Hennepin History Museum)
Frick Residence, New York
Dominican Academy High School, formerly the Michael Friedsam Residence, New York
Isaac Guggenheim residence, Port Washington, New York
Matinecock, Estate of J.P. Morgan. Jr., Long Island, New York
Eagle's Nest, Estate of William K. Vanderbilt II, Long Island, New York
Elie Nadelman residence, New York
Mrs. P.A. Rockefeller residence, Fayetteville, New York
Walter Rosen, Caramoor, Katonah, New York
Reynolda House, Winston-Salem, North Carolina
Stan Hywet Hall, Frank A. Seiberling residence, Akron, Ohio
E.W. Marland Estate, Ponca City, Oklahoma
Edward Bok residence, Philadelphia, Pennsylvania
Henry F. Miller residence, Philadelphia, Pennsylvania
High Hollow, George Howe residence, Philadelphia, Pennsylvania
Richard B. Mellon residence, Pittsburgh, Pennsylvania
Cornelius Vanderbilt Whitney residence, Deer Run, Pennsylvania

Architects whose names appear in Yellin's job book

Ralph Adams Cram, Boston, MA
Paul Cret, Philadelphia, PA
Cass Gilbert, New York, NY
Bertram Goodhue, Boston and New York
George Howe, Philadelphia, PA
Benno Janssen, Pittsburgh, PA
Charles Klauder, Philadelphia, PA
Milton Bennett Medary, Philadelphia, PA
Arthur Ingersoll Meigs, Philadelphia, PA
Walter Mellor, Philadelphia, PA
George Washington Smith, Montecito, CA
Horace Trumbauer, Philadelphia, PA
Walker and Gillette, New York, NY
Clarence C. Zantzinger, Philadelphia, PA

References

Citations

Sources
Andrews, Jack,  Samuel Yellin: Metalsmith, Skipjack Press, Ocean Pines Maryland, 2000
Andrews, Jack, Samuel Yellin, Metalworker, Anvil's Ring, Summer, 1982
Architecture magazine, April 1929
Bach, Penny Balkin, Public Art in Philadelphia, Temple University Press, Philadelphia, Pennsylvania, 1992
Bedford, Steven McLeod, John Russell Pope: Architect of Empire, Rizzoli International Publications, NY, NY 1998
Bok, Edward W., America's Taj Mahal: The Singing Tower of Florida, The Georgia Marble Company, Tate, Georgia c. 1929
Davis, Myra T., Sketches in Iron, no publishing information
Detroit Institute of Arts: The Architecture, The Detroit Institute of Arts 1928
Fariello, Anna, "Samuel Yellin:  Sketching in Iron," Metalsmith Magazine, Fall 2003, http://www.ganoksin.com/borisat/nenam/samuel-yellin.htm
Federman, Peter, The Detroit Public Library, Classical America IV, Classical America 1977
Gallery, John A., Editor, Philadelphia Architecture: A Guide to the City, MIT Press, Cambridge, Massachusetts 1984
Harrington, Ty, "The Wizardry of Samuel Yellin, Artist in Metals", Smithsonian, vol. 12, no. 12 (March 1982), pp. 65–75
Heilbrun, Margaret, The Architecture of Cass Gilbert, Inventing the Skyline, Columbia University Press, New York, NY 2000
Kvaran, Einar Einarsson, Architectural Sculpture of America, unpublished manuscript
Teitelman, Edward & Richard W. Longstreth, Architecture in Philadelphia: A Guide,  MIT Press, Cambridge, Massachusetts 1981
Wattenmaker, Richard J., Samuel Yellin in Context, Flint Museum of Arts, Flint, Michigan 1985
Wister, Cret, Gilchrist et al., Melor Meigs & Howe, Graybooks, Boulder Colorado 1991 (reprint of 1923 work)

External links

Samuel Yellin, Iron Worker, at Philadelphia Architects and Buildings

1880s births
1940 deaths
Artists from Philadelphia
American blacksmiths
American people of Polish-Jewish descent
Jews from Galicia (Eastern Europe)
Polish emigrants to the United States
University of the Arts (Philadelphia) alumni
University of the Arts (Philadelphia) faculty